Halal is an Arabic word that translates to  in English. In the Quran, the term halal is contrasted with the term haram. This binary opposition was elaborated into a more complex classification known as "the five decisions": mandatory, recommended, neutral, reprehensible and forbidden. Islamic jurists disagree on whether the term halal covers the first two or the first four of these categories. In recent times, Islamic movements seeking to mobilize the masses and authors writing for a popular audience have emphasized the simpler distinction of halal and haram.

The term halal is particularly associated with Islamic dietary laws and especially meat processed and prepared in accordance with those requirements.

In the Quran 
The words halal and haram are the usual terms used in the Quran to designate the categories of lawful or allowed and unlawful or forbidden. In the Quran, the root h-l-l denotes lawfulness and may also indicate exiting the ritual state of a pilgrim and entering a profane state. In both these senses, it has an opposite meaning to that conveyed by the root h-r-m (cf. haram and ). In a literal sense, the root h-r-m may refer to dissolution (e.g., breaking of an oath) or alighting (e.g., of God's wrath). Lawfulness is usually indicated in the Quran by means of the verb , with God as the stated or implied subject.

Foods 

Islam generally considers every food halal unless it is specifically prohibited in hadith or the Qur'an. Specifically, halal foods are those that are:

 Made, produced, manufactured, processed, and stored using machinery, equipment, and/or utensils that have been cleaned according to Islamic law (shariah).
 Free from any component that Muslims are prohibited from eating according to Islamic law.

The most common example of haram (non-halal) food is pork. While pork is the only meat that categorically may not be consumed by Muslims (the Quran forbids it, Surah 2:173 and 16:115) other foods not in a state of purity are also considered haram. The criteria for non-pork items include their source, the cause of the animal's death and how it was processed. The majority of Islamic scholars consider shellfish and other seafood halal. Vegetarian cuisine is halal if it does not contain alcohol.

Muslims must also ensure that all foods (particularly processed foods), as well as non-food items like cosmetics and pharmaceuticals, are halal. Frequently, these products contain animal by-products or other ingredients that are not permissible for Muslims to eat or use on their bodies. Foods which are not considered halal for Muslims to consume include blood and intoxicants such as alcoholic beverages.

A Muslim who would otherwise starve to death is allowed to eat non-halal food if there is no halal food available. During airplane flights Muslims will usually order kosher food (if halal food is not available) to ensure their chosen dish will not have any pork ingredients.

Several food companies offer halal processed foods and products, including halal foie gras, spring rolls, chicken nuggets, ravioli, lasagna, pizza and baby food. Halal ready meals are a growing consumer market for Muslims in Britain and America and are offered by an increasing number of retailers.

Opinions on GMO foods are mixed, although there is no widely accepted prohibition from consuming them. Some clerics and scholars have expressed support, arguing that such food production methods are halal because they contribute to human well-being. Voices in opposition to GMOs argue that there is no need for genetic modification of food crops because God created everything perfectly and man does not have any right to manipulate anything that God has created. Some others have raised concern about the theoretical consumption of specific GMO foods produced using genes from pigs.

Halal meat

Halal meat must come from a supplier that uses halal practices.  is the prescribed method of slaughter for all meat sources, excluding fish and other sealife, per Islamic law. This method of slaughtering animals consists of using a sharp knife to make an incision that cuts the front of the throat, oesophagus and jugular veins but not the spinal cord. In addition to the direction, permitted animals should be slaughtered upon utterance of the Islamic prayer Bismillah.

The slaughter must be performed by a Muslim man. Carrion (carcasses of dead animals, such as animals who died in the wild) cannot be eaten. Additionally, an animal that has been strangled, beaten (to death), killed by a fall, gored (to death), savaged by a beast of prey (unless finished off by a human), or sacrificed on a stone altar cannot be eaten.

Compatibility with other religions

Animals slaughtered by non-Muslims can also be considered halal if the slaughter is carried out by jugular slice, the blood drained and the name of God invoked. As a result, kosher meat is permitted by some Muslim communities.

In Sikhism, the religious prescriptions forbid from eating meat of animals that were slaughtered slowly or with religious ritual, which they refer to as kutha meat. This includes halal meat preparation.

Concerns for animal welfare

Stunning of the animal is not allowed before slaughtering. It is allowed only if necessary to calm down a violent animal. However, the UK Food Standards Agency figures from 2011 suggest that 84% of cattle, 81% of sheep and 88% of chickens slaughtered for halal meat were stunned before they died. Supermarkets selling halal products also report that all animals are stunned before they are slaughtered. Tesco, for example, says "the only difference between the halal meat it sells and other meat is that it was blessed as it was killed." Concerns about animal suffering from slaughter without prior stunning has resulted in the ban of slaughter of unstunned animals in Denmark, Luxembourg, Belgium, The Netherlands, Norway, Sweden and Switzerland.

Certification

Certification for halal products is given by legal authorities in most Muslim-majority countries, while in other countries, it is voluntarily acquired by companies and issued by non-governmental organizations for an annual fee.

Halal certification in the USA 
Halal certifications are provided by two major non-profit agencies in the United States, namely, the Halal Monitoring Services (HMS), based out of Chicago, Illinois, and the Halal Food Standards Alliance of America (HFSAA), based out of Oakland, California.

Criticism 
In Australia, halal food certification has been criticized by groups who claim that certifying foods as halal leads to consumers subsidizing a particular religious belief. Australian Federation of Islamic Councils spokesman Keysar Trad told a journalist in July 2014 that this was an attempt to exploit anti-Muslim sentiments in Australia. A study in 2022 showed that halal certifications did not necessarily reflect the extent to which a halal product came about in whole, and called for greater means of assurance and transparent qualitative methods of halal certification.

Business 
The Dubai Chamber of Commerce and Industry estimated the global industry value of halal food consumer purchases to be $1.1 trillion in 2013, accounting for 16.6 percent of the global food and beverage market, with an annual growth of 6.9 percent. Growth regions include Indonesia ($197 million market value in 2012) and Turkey ($100 million). The European Union market for halal food has an estimated annual growth of around 15 percent and is worth an estimated $30 billion, approximately $8 billion of which are accounted for in France.

The halal food and beverage industry has also made a significant impact on supermarkets and other food business such as restaurants. French supermarkets had halal food sales totalling $210 million in 2011, a 10.5% growth from five years prior. In France, the market for halal foods is even larger than the market for other types of common foods. For example, in 2010, the market for halal foods and beverages in France was nearly twice that of organic foods. Auchan, a large French supermarket chain, now sells 80 certified halal meat products, along with 30 pre-cooked halal meals and 40 frozen halal products. Upscale restaurants and catering services have also added halal foods to their menus. In addition, many beverage companies such as Evian have taken the effort to add a halal stamp on their products to show that their water and other beverages are pure and not haram or forbidden under Islamic law.

Interaction with global regulation
Halal standards and regulations have been considered as an obstacle to international trade while the discrimination towards import products also lacks transparency. Trade disputes related to halal have emerged even among Muslim and Islamic countries, for instance at the regional level within the ASEAN.

European Union 
On 17 December 2020, the Court of Justice of the European Union ruled that member countries may ban religious slaughter in order to promote animal welfare and could impose non-lethal stunning before the killing of animals. The ruling was in response to a challenge to a 2017 Flemish government prohibition on the killing of animals without prior non-lethal (also called reversible) stunning by Jewish and Muslim associations.

India 

The Muslim community has been receptive of halal food and certification. Members of the right-wing Hindutva groups in India have protested against the sale of Halal food in India. Bajrang Dal, Vishva Hindu Parishad and other Hindutva groups have run door to door campaigns in the state of Karnataka, asking people not to purchase halal meat. In March 2022 the Hindutva group Bajrang Dal physically attacked a Muslim meat seller, five persons were arrested in the incident. In March 2022, C. T. Ravi, national general secretary for the ruling Bharatiya Janata Party, referred to halal food as "economic jihad".

However, as Hindutva groups are a minority inside Hinduism, many irreligious Hindus purchase halal meat in preference to  meat. This is because  (killing the animal in one blow) leaves the blood inside the meat.

United Kingdom
, an estimated 27 UK Tesco supermarkets, in addition to most urban Asda and many Morrisons supermarkets, had halal meat counters, selling meat approved for consumption by Muslims. According to the Food Standards Agency Animal Welfare Update report, published September 2017, 16 percent of animals slaughtered by the halal method were not stunned before slaughter, which violates RSPCA standards on animal welfare. However, it is legal in the UK due to an exemption in the law granted to Jews and Muslims.

Non-food applications 

In addition to food and diet, a halal lifestyle can include travel, finance, clothing, media, recreation, cosmetics. A halal lifestyle can even involve professional practises ranging from industrial and manufacturing logistics to supply chains.

Pharmaceuticals 
Some Muslims refrain from using pharmaceuticals that are not halal. On the other hand, the Quran obliges Muslims to seek treatment, including preventive ones, for diseases regardless of what the care provider believes in. In particular, medicines containing animal products like gelatin have been deemed permissible by a 1995 council of Islamic jurisprudents, making such distinction unnecessary. The decentralized nature of Islam allows both opinions to exist.

Vaccines

The controversy over pharmaceuticals has led to the refusal of childhood vaccination in some Muslim-majority countries, despite many religious leaders expressly endorsing vaccination. It is also a concern in the rollout of the COVID-19 vaccine.

Personal care 
Feminine hygiene products and diapers have been certified as halal in Malaysia. Such certification is not required by the religion, nor is there a demand from Muslims. Critics consider such "unnecessary" certification as little more than a marketing gimmick, e.g., halal labels on clearly vegetarian soft drinks or naturally grown food items like cereals, pulses, vegetables and processed foods made exclusively from vegetable products.

See also 

 Islamic ethics
 , a Shi'a text which contains all the details of halal things.
 
 Halal certification in Australia
 Halal certification in Europe
 Taboo food and drink
 Kashrut (Jewish dietary laws)
 Christian dietary laws
 Scottish pork taboo

References

Further reading 
 Yungman, Limor, "Food", in Muhammad in History, Thought, and Culture: An Encyclopedia of the Prophet of God (2 vols.), Edited by C. Fitzpatrick and A. Walker, Santa Barbara, ABC-CLIO, 2014, Vol I.

External links 

 What is halal meat?
Halal World certificate

 
Food law
Islamic terminology
Ritual slaughter